Méline Orlane Christine Gérard (born 30 May 1990) is a French professional footballer who plays as a goalkeeper for Spanish Primera División club Real Madrid. She has also played for the France national team, having made her debut on 4 March 2015 in an Algarve Cup match against Portugal.

Career statistics

International

Honours
Lyon
UEFA Women's Champions League: Winner 2015–16, 2016–17
Division 1 Féminine: Winner 2014–15, 2015–16, 2016–17
Coupe de France: Winner 2014–15, 2015–16, 2016–17

France
SheBelieves Cup: Winner 2017

References

External links

 
 
 Méline Gérard at footofeminin.fr 
 

1990 births
Living people
Women's association football goalkeepers
French women's footballers
France women's international footballers
2015 FIFA Women's World Cup players
Olympic footballers of France
Footballers at the 2016 Summer Olympics
Division 1 Féminine players
Paris Saint-Germain Féminine players
AS Saint-Étienne (women) players
Olympique Lyonnais Féminin players
Montpellier HSC (women) players
Primera División (women) players
Real Betis Féminas players
French expatriate women's footballers
French expatriate sportspeople in Spain
Expatriate women's footballers in Spain
UEFA Women's Euro 2017 players